8 Mile Corner is a monument in the Cimarron National Grassland dedicated to the tri-point (a place where three states meet) of Kansas, Colorado, and Oklahoma. This point is also the meeting point for three distinct regions of America – the Western United States (Colorado), the Midwestern United States (Kansas), and the Southern United States (Oklahoma). The landmark was a windmill with the three states' abbreviated names on the blades. The windpump monument was built in 1903.

In 1990, satellite images showed the actual meeting place to be several feet away from the monument. A brass plate in the ground marks this.

The view around this site has been described as "starkly beautiful", with yucca blooms in the spring and buffalo gourd in the summer as the most notable flora. Visitors are likely to see mule deer, prairie dogs, and burrowing owls.

See also
 Cimarron National Grassland
 Tri-point
 List of Oklahoma tri-points
 Four Corners Monument: monument on the Arizona-Colorado-New Mexico-Utah border

Notes

References

External links
 8 mile corner windmill

Buildings and structures in Baca County, Colorado
Borders of Kansas
Borders of Colorado
Borders of Oklahoma
Buildings and structures in Cimarron County, Oklahoma
Buildings and structures in Morton County, Kansas
Protected areas of Kansas
Border tripoints
Buildings and structures completed in 1903
Monuments and memorials in Colorado
Monuments and memorials in Kansas
Monuments and memorials in Oklahoma
Tourist attractions in Baca County, Colorado
Tourist attractions in Morton County, Kansas
Tourist attractions in Cimarron County, Oklahoma
1903 sculptures
Windpumps in the United States
Boundary markers